Gold for the Tough Guys of the Prairie is a 1971 Danish comedy film directed by Finn Karlsson and starring Dirch Passer.

Cast
 Dirch Passer - Biggy
 Willy Rathnov - Sam
 Paul Hagen - Shorty
 Preben Kaas - Ben
 Judy Gringer - Swingdoor-Susie
 Lykke Nielsen - Shannahoo
 Preben Mahrt - Old Jeff
 Carl Ottosen - The Sheriff of Greenville
 Jesper Klein - Telegraph Manager
 Jørgen Kiil - The Sheriff of Cornerstone
 Lars Lunøe - Slim O'Hara
 Otto Brandenburg - Cowboy
 Jens Jørgen Thorsen - Cowboy
 Poul Glargaard - Cowboy
 René de Fries - Cowboy
 Reginald Samsø - Cowboy
 Dale Robinson - Cowboy
 Sven Cleemann - Cowboy
 Susanne Breuning - Girl
 Kirsten Sloth - Jenny
 Kurt Andersen - Linedancer
 John Mogensen - Saloonpianist

External links

1971 films
1970s Danish-language films
1971 comedy films
Danish comedy films
Films scored by Sven Gyldmark